Fairfield was launched in Aberdeen in 1825 and sailed to Australia and the West Indies. She was last listed in 1839.

Career
Fairfield first entered Lloyd's Register (LR) in 1825.

 sailed from Sydney on 12 April 1829, bound for Batavia. she reached the Torres Straits on 5 May, and the next day wrecked on a reef. The crew survived on her quarter deck for three days before they were able to launch her boats. They then sailed to Murray Island, where they found Fairfield, Both, master, which rescued them.

In 1834 a new owner changed Fairfields registry to London. He also sailed her as a West Indiaman.

Citations

1825 ships
Ships built in Aberdeen
Age of Sail merchant ships of England